An auto sear ("automatic sear") is a part of an automatic firearm (designated "machine gun" by the Bureau of Alcohol, Tobacco, Firearms and Explosives, any firearm capable of firing more than one round with a single operation of the trigger mechanism) that holds the hammer in the cocked position while the bolt of the weapon is cycling.  An auto sear is required in nearly every automatic rifle, especially assault rifles.

An auto sear transforms a semi-automatic gun into a weapon capable of emptying an entire magazine with a single movement of the trigger.

See also 

 Glock Switch

References 

Firearm components